Naqash is a surname. Notable people with the surname include:

 Asiya Naqash, Indian politician
 Muhammad Yousuf Naqash, Kashmiri politician
 Mohammad Naqash, Pakistani cricketer
 Sahir Naqash (born 1990), German cricketer